James Anthony Church (11 May 1930 – 25 March 2008) was an English actor, who has appeared on stage and screen. In 1989 he became the Dean of the National Theatre Conservatory, which is the teaching arm of the Denver Center Theatre Company in Denver, Colorado.

Stage
Church was educated at Hurstpierpoint College, and Clare College, Cambridge. In 1953 when fellow Cambridge student Peter Hall directed his first professional production—Pirandello's Henry IV at the Arts Theatre, London—Church was a performer. In 1960 Hall set up the new Royal Shakespeare Company and Church joined him as a founder member.

He was a regular performer with the company until 1987. In 1988 Church took leading parts in Cymbeline, The Winter's Tale and The Tempest, once again under the direction of Peter Hall, at London's National Theatre. He appeared for the last time on the Stratford stage on 31 March 2007, in a special programme marking the closure of the Royal Shakespeare Theatre.

He was appointed Director of Drama at the Guildhall School of Music and Drama in 1982, leaving to take up the post with the Denver Center for the Performing Arts in 1989.

Film and television
He appeared in Work Is a Four-Letter Word (1968), On Giant's Shoulders (1979), Tess (1979), and Krull (1983). In the 1963 BBC production of As You Like It he played Duke Frederick. Later he played Frederick's banished brother, Duke Senior, in the 1978 BBC Television Shakespeare production. He also had small roles as Squire Bancroft in  Lillie and Samuel Hoare in Edward & Mrs. Simpson.

Filmography

References

Other sources

Who's Who (2007): James Anthony Church
A Stage for a Kingdom (2013) Tony Church

External links

 Obituary, The Guardian, 28 March 2008
Obituary, The Independent, 31 March 2008
Obituary, The Times, 2 April 2008

1930 births
2008 deaths
English male stage actors
English male television actors
Alumni of Clare College, Cambridge
People educated at Hurstpierpoint College
English male Shakespearean actors
Royal Shakespeare Company members